Bab al-Faraj may refer to places in Syria:

Bab al-Faraj (Aleppo), one of the gates of the old city of Aleppo
Bab al-Faraj (Damascus), one of the gates of the old city of Damascus